Elizabeth Kay Andrews, Baroness Andrews,  (born 16 May 1943) is a British Labour politician and life peer. She was Chair of English Heritage from July 2009 to July 2013.

She worked as a Library Clerk (senior researcher) in the House of Commons Library from 1970 to 1985 and was one of the first people in public service to job share. She then became a policy adviser to Neil Kinnock in his office as Leader of the Opposition 1985–92. She served as Director of Education Extra until 2002.

She was created a life peer as Baroness Andrews, of Southover in the County of East Sussex on 9 May 2000. In the House of Lords, she served as a Government Whip from May 2002 and was a Government Spokesperson for Education and Skills; Health; and Work and Pensions until the election in May 2005. She was then appointed Parliamentary Under Secretary of State at the Department for Communities and Local Government. She stood down from Government in July 2009.

On 27 July 2009, Andrews became the Chair of English Heritage. She was the first woman to head the organisation. She stood down from the position in July 2013.

She is a Vice President of the Campaign for National Parks, President of the Friends of Lewes and a Trustee of the Prince’s Regeneration Trust.

Honours
Andrews was appointed an Officer of the Order of the British Empire (OBE) in the 1998 Birthday Honours On 15 October 2015, she was elected a Fellow of the Society of Antiquaries of London (FSA).

References

External links

1943 births
Living people
Officers of the Order of the British Empire
Life peeresses created by Elizabeth II
Labour Party (UK) life peers
Fellows of the Society of Antiquaries of London